Rosario Fina (born 23 March 1969) is an Italian former professional racing cyclist. He rode in two editions of the Tour de France and one edition of the Vuelta a España.

Major results

1987
 1st  Team time trial, UCI Junior World Road Championships
1991
 1st Coppa San Geo
 1st Giro delle Valli Aretine
1992
 2nd Time trial, National Amateur Road Championships
1993
 1st  Team time trial, UCI Road World Championships
 1st Freccia dei Vini
 2nd Overall Giro della Valle d'Aosta
1st Stage 1
 2nd GP Industria Artigianato e Commercio Carnaghese
1994
 2nd Time trial, National Road Championships
1995
 8th Firenze–Pistoia
1996
 1st Stage 1 Vuelta a Aragón

References

External links
 

1969 births
Living people
People from San Cataldo, Sicily
Italian male cyclists
Sportspeople from the Province of Caltanissetta
Cyclists from Sicily
20th-century Italian people